Waltham Township may refer to the following places in the United States:

Waltham Township, LaSalle County, Illinois
Waltham Township, Mower County, Minnesota
Waltham Township, Kay County, Oklahoma

See also

Waltham (disambiguation)

Township name disambiguation pages